Novgorod-Seversky Uyezd (Новгород-Северский уезд) was one of the subdivisions of the Chernigov Governorate of the Russian Empire. It was situated in the eastern part of the governorate. Its administrative centre was Novgorod-Seversky (Novhorod-Siverskyi).

Demographics
At the time of the Russian Empire Census of 1897, Novgorod-Seversky Uyezd had a population of 146,236. Of these, 91.1% spoke Ukrainian, 4.4% Yiddish, 4.3% Russian and 0.1% Polish as their native language.

References

 
Uyezds of Chernigov Governorate
Chernigov Governorate